In the United States, the perfect tender rule refers to the legal right for a buyer of goods to insist upon "perfect tender" by the seller. In a contract for the sale of goods, if the goods fail to conform exactly to the description in the contract (whether as to quality, quantity or manner of delivery) the buyer may nonetheless accept the goods, or reject the goods, or reject the nonconforming part of the tender and accept the conforming part.  (UCC 2-601.)  The buyer does not have an unfettered ability to reject tender.

Contrast the perfect tender rule, which applies through the Uniform Commercial Code to the sale of goods, with the substantial performance doctrine, which applies in the common law to non-UCC cases.

See also
Substantial performance

Contract law